Djordje Djokovic (born 17 July 1995) is a Serbian former tennis player and tournament director of the Serbia Open, held at his brother Novak's Novak Tennis Center. He is the youngest son of Dijana and Srđan Đoković. He is the younger brother of Novak and Marko Djokovic.

Tennis career
Djordje Djokovic's highest professional accomplishment to date is reaching the doubles quarterfinals at the 2015 China Open.

Personal life
On September 12, 2022, Djordje married Aleksandra Saska Veselinov, niece of Dragan Veselinov, former Serbian Minister of Agriculture.

Career statistics

Challengers and futures finals

Doubles 1 (1–0)

References

External links

1995 births
Living people
Serbian male tennis players
Tennis players from Belgrade
Novak Djokovic